Muxsa Willk'i (Aymara, muxsa sweet, willk'i gap, also spelled Mojsa Willkhi) is a  mountain in the Andes of Bolivia. It is located in the La Paz Department, Pacajes Province, Coro Coro Municipality. Muxsa Will'i lies southwest of Waylla Pukara and west of Achachi Qala.

References 

Mountains of La Paz Department (Bolivia)